Krishnarao Ganpatrao Sable, popularly known as Shahir Sable (3 September 1923 – 20 March 2015), was a Marathi language folk artist from Maharashtra, India. He was an accomplished singer, playwright, performer and folk theatre (Loknatya) producer & director. He was awarded with Padma Shri – India's fourth highest civilian honour, in 1998 for his contribution in the field of arts.

Early life
Shahir Sable was born in a small village called Pasarni, in the Wai taluka of district Satara to Ganpatrao Sable in 1923. He learned to play the flute in childhood. After finishing his primary schooling in Pasarni, he moved to his maternal uncle's place in Amalner, Jalgaon, where he studied till 7th grade and soon left school. At Amalner, he became close to Sane Guruji and spent time with Sane Guruji during the freedom struggle. With his shahiri, he started contributing to the struggle. He also started "Jagruti Shahir Mandal" during that time.

Famous works
Maharashtrachi Lokadhara (Folk dances of Maharashtra) – Maharashtrachi Lokadhara had performed all over India as a renowned troupe formed by Shahir Sable showcasing all native dance forms of Maharashtra. He gave rebirth to some of the old traditions of folk like Lavani, Balyanruttya, Kolinruttya, Gondhalinruttya, Manglagaur, Vaghyamurali, Vasudeo, Dhangar etc.

Noted Songs

 Jai Jai Maharashtra Maza
 Adhi Ganala Rani Aan Na]
 Are Krishna Are Kanha
 Athshe Khidkya Navshe Daara
 Garjaa Maharashtra Majha
 Hay Pavlay Dev Majha Malhari
 Jezurichya Khanderaya
 Maharashtra Jai Maharashtra Jai
 Navra Nako Ga Bai
 Run Zun Vaajantri
 Sahyadricha Sinha Garjato
 Ved Lagale
 Ya Go Dandyavarna Boltoy
 Malharavaari

Noted Plays
 Andhala Daltay – Shahir Sable staged this farcical play highlighting the sorry plight of the Marathi speaking residents of Mumbai. The lore has it that the play was so impactful that it led to the formation of the Shivsena, a political party safeguarding the rights of the native Marathi populace.

Family
Notable family members of Shahir Sable -
 Bhanumati Sable (Wife) - first wife of Shahir Sable and a poet. Many of his famous songs were written by her.
 Devdatta Sable (Son) - Marathi music composer.
 Shivadarshan Sable (Grandson) - film director and producer.
 Charusheela Sable (Daughter) - Marathi actress
 Ajit Vachani (Son-in-law) - husband of Charusheela Sable and famous Indian film and television actor.
 Yohana Vachani (Grand Daughter) - actress and dancer.
 Trishala Vachani (Grand Daughter)
 Vasundhara Sable (Daughter) - Marathi writer.
 Omkar Mangesh Dutt (Grandson) - Marathi screenwriter.
 Yugesha Omkar (Grand daughter-in-law) - Costume designer.
 Yashodhara Shinde (Daughter)
 Kedar Shinde(Grandson) -  famous film director and writer.
 Sana Kedar Shinde (Great-Grand Daughter) - a Marathi actress.
 Radhabai Sable - second wife of Shahir Sable.

Awards and recognition

 1984: Sangeet Natak Akademi Award
 1988: Shahir Amar Sheikh Puraskar
 1990: President, 70th Akhil Bharatiya Marathi Natya Sammelan, Mumbai
 1990: President, Akhil Bharatiya Marathi Shahir Parishad, Mumbai
 1990: Maharashtra Gaurav Puraskar
 1994: Sant Namdev Puraskar
 1997: Satara Bhushan Puraskar
 1997: Shahir Patthe Bapurao Puraskar
 1997: Maharashtra Rajya Gaurav Puraskar
 1998: Padma Shri (India's fourth highest civilian honour) for his contribution in the field of arts.
 2001: Best Singer award from Maharashtra State Govt.
 2002: P Sawlaram Puraskar
 2002: Shahir Pharande puraskar
 2005: Maharashra Bhushan award by Maharashtra Times
 2006: Maharashtra Ratna puraskar
 2012: Lokshahir Vittal Umap Mrudgandh Lifetime Achievement award

Death

He died in his residence in Mumbai on 20 March 2015 at the age of 91.

Legacy 

 Jai Jai Maharashtra Maza, originally sung by Shahir Sable, is widely used and played in the official functions of Maharashtra Government. It was declared as the official song of Maharashtra state in 2023.
 Maharashtrachi Lokadhara was later adapted into TV format by his grandson Kedar Shinde. The show aired on Zee Marathi.
 Many of the songs composed by him (including Jai Jai Maharashtra Maza, Are Krishna Are Kanha, Malharavaari) were later adapted by many contemporary artists for Marathi films.
 A biographical film, Maharashtra Shahir, based on his life and times is scheduled to be theatrically released on 28 April 2023. It is directed by his grandson and noted film director, Kedar Shinde. The film stars his great-grand daughter, Sana Kedar Shinde, in the role of Bhanumati Sable.

References

Indian male folk singers
1923 births
2015 deaths
People with Alzheimer's disease
Singers from Mumbai
Marathi people
Recipients of the Padma Shri in arts
People from Satara district
20th-century Indian singers
20th-century Indian male singers